Arthur Gray (4 September 1917 – 25 August 1991) was an English rugby union, and professional rugby league footballer who played in the 1940s.

Background
Arthur Gray was born in Leeds, West Riding of Yorkshire, England, and he died aged 73 in Scarborough, North Yorkshire, England.

Playing career

International honours
Arthur Gray made his international rugby union début, and scored a conversion, in England's 9-6 victory over Wales at Cardiff Arms Park on Saturday 18 January 1947.
see List of England national rugby union team - Results 1947. He played two further rugby union internationals, in the 1947 Five Nations Championship against Ireland, and Scotland.

Cluvb career
Arthur Gray made his début for Wakefield Trinity during April 1947, and he played his last match for Wakefield Trinity during the 1949–50 season

References

External links
Search for "Gray" at rugbyleagueproject.org
History Of Otley RUFC
Search for "Arthur Gray" at britishnewspaperarchive.co.uk

1917 births
1991 deaths
English rugby league players
English rugby union players
Otley R.U.F.C. players
Rugby league fullbacks
Rugby league players from Leeds
Rugby union fullbacks
Rugby union players from Leeds
Wakefield Trinity players
England international rugby union players